Aurelia Catalina Pentón Conde (born February 13, 1941) is a retired track and field athlete from Cuba, who competed in the 400 and 800 metres during her career.

Pentón was born in Sancti Spíritus, and twice represented her native country at the Summer Olympics: 1968 and 1972.

Her time of 50.56, set at altitude in Medellín, Colombia while winning the 1978 Central American and Caribbean Games is the officially ratified masters athletics world record for the W35 400 metres.

References

 

1941 births
Living people
Cuban female sprinters
Cuban female middle-distance runners
Athletes (track and field) at the 1968 Summer Olympics
Athletes (track and field) at the 1972 Summer Olympics
Athletes (track and field) at the 1967 Pan American Games
Athletes (track and field) at the 1971 Pan American Games
Athletes (track and field) at the 1975 Pan American Games
Athletes (track and field) at the 1979 Pan American Games
Olympic athletes of Cuba
People from Sancti Spíritus
Cuban masters athletes
World record holders in masters athletics
Pan American Games silver medalists for Cuba
Pan American Games bronze medalists for Cuba
Pan American Games medalists in athletics (track and field)
Universiade medalists in athletics (track and field)
Central American and Caribbean Games gold medalists for Cuba
Central American and Caribbean Games silver medalists for Cuba
Competitors at the 1970 Central American and Caribbean Games
Competitors at the 1974 Central American and Caribbean Games
Competitors at the 1978 Central American and Caribbean Games
Universiade bronze medalists for Cuba
Central American and Caribbean Games medalists in athletics
Medalists at the 1970 Summer Universiade
Medalists at the 1971 Pan American Games
Medalists at the 1975 Pan American Games
Medalists at the 1979 Pan American Games
Olympic female sprinters
20th-century Cuban women